Camphor is a chemical compound.

Camphor may also refer to:
 Camphor (album), a 2002 David Sylvian album
 Camphor Hall, a residence hall at Dillard University
 Alexander Priestly Camphor (1865–1919), American Missionary Bishop of the Methodist Episcopal Church and namesake of Camphor Hall
 Camphor tree, a common name for the evergreen Camphora officinarum

See also
 Camphora (disambiguation)
 Kämpfer, a Japanese light novel series